Asper may refer to:

Asper (') breathing mark in romanization of Greek
Asper (surname)
Asper, Missouri, a ghost town 
Aemilius Asper, Latin grammarian
Aspron, a type of late Byzantine silver or billon coins
Akçe, an Ottoman silver coin, similar to the aspron
Asper School of Business, part of the University of Manitoba
 Asper, a steel roller coaster manufactured by Gerstlauer that operates at Fun Land USA in Miami, FL

See also
Asper, Belgium, a Belgian village belonging to the municipality of Gavere
Bothrops asper, a species of pit vipers